This is a list of diplomatic missions of Comoros, excluding honorary consulates. Comoros is a small island nation in the Indian Ocean just north of Madagascar. It has a very modest diplomatic presence worldwide.

Africa

 Cairo (Embassy)

 Addis Ababa (Embassy)

 Tripoli (Embassy)

 Antananarivo (Embassy)
 Mahajanga (Consulate)

 Rabat (Embassy)

 Dakar (Embassy)

 Pretoria (Embassy)

 Dar es Salaam (Embassy)

Asia

 Beijing (Embassy)

 Tehran (Embassy)

 Kuwait City (Embassy)

 Doha (Embassy)

 Riyadh (Embassy)
 Jeddah (Consulate)

 Abu Dhabi (Embassy)

Europe

 Brussels (Embassy)

 Paris (Embassy)

Multilateral organizations

Cairo (Permanent Mission to the Arab League)

New York (Permanent Mission to the United Nations)

See also
 Foreign relations of Comoros
 Visa policy of Comoros

References

Permanent Mission of Comoros to the United Nations in New York

Foreign relations of the Comoros
Diplomatic missions
Comoros